Myxine limosa, or Girard's Atlantic hagfish, is a jawless fish in the genus Myxine. The species was described by Charles Frédéric Girard, a French zoologist, in 1859. It occurs in deep waters of the Western Atlantic Ocean, from the western coast of Greenland down to the Gulf of Mexico.

References 

Myxinidae
Fish of North America